

325001–325100 

|-bgcolor=#f2f2f2
| colspan=4 align=center | 
|}

325101–325200 

|-id=136
| 325136 Zhongnanshan ||  || Zhong Nanshan (born 1936), an academician of the Chinese Academy of Engineering, is both the main advocate of early prevention, diagnosis and management of chronic airway diseases, and an important contributor in combating major public health emergencies (such as SARS and COVID–19) in China. || 
|}

325201–325300 

|-bgcolor=#f2f2f2
| colspan=4 align=center | 
|}

325301–325400 

|-id=366
| 325366 Asturias ||  || The Principality of Asturias, an autonomous community located in the north-western part of Spain || 
|-id=368
| 325368 Ihorhuk ||  || Ihor Huk (born 1952), a professor of surgery at the Medical University of Vienna, and a foreign member of the National Academy of Sciences of the Ukraine. || 
|-id=369
| 325369 Shishilov ||  || Shishilov Viktor Fedorovich (born 1939), who developed tourism in Russia, specifically in Suzdal, Vladimir Oblas. || 
|}

325401–325500 

|-id=436
| 325436 Khlebov ||  || Khlebov Aleksandr Veniaminovich (born 1966), head of the Observatory and the astronomical club DD(U)T (Izhevsk, Russia) between 1987 and 2003 || 
|-id=455
| 325455 Della Valle ||  || Massimo Della Valle (born 1957), an Italian astronomer || 
|}

325501–325600 

|-id=558
| 325558 Guyane ||  || Guyane, the official name for French Guiana, an overseas region of France on the North Atlantic coast of South America. || 
|-id=588
| 325588 Bridzius ||  || Audrius Bridzius (born 1966), President of Lithuanian Astronomical Union (2007–2011), is Senior Researcher at the Astronomical Observatory of Vilnius University. He is an expert in stellar photometry and extragalactic astronomy. He is an organizer of the National and International Astronomy Olympiads for school students || 
|}

325601–325700 

|-bgcolor=#f2f2f2
| colspan=4 align=center | 
|}

325701–325800 

|-bgcolor=#f2f2f2
| colspan=4 align=center | 
|}

325801–325900 

|-id=812
| 325812 Zouchenglu ||  || Chen-Lu Tsou (1923–2006), an academician of the Chinese Academy of Sciences, was a founder and pioneer of biochemistry in China. He made significant contributions to the development of biochemistry research. (Alternative spellings of his name include Zou Chenglu and Chenglu Zou.) || 
|}

325901–326000 

|-id=973
| 325973 Cardinal ||  || Robert Damian Cardinal (born 1969), a research associate at the University of Calgary || 
|}

References 

325001-326000